Donnachie Cliff is a cliff on Ulu Peninsula, James Ross Island, rising to about  northeast of Back Mesa. Following geological work by the British Antarctic Survey, 1985–86, it was named by the UK Antarctic Place-Names Committee after Thomas Donnachie, a radio operator on Operation Tabarin at Hope Bay, 1944–45.

References 

Cliffs of James Ross Island